St. Stephen's Anglican Church is a historic stone church located at 45 Donaldson Road in the Buckingham sector of Gatineau, Quebec, Canada. First organized as a congregation in 1845, St. Stephen's counts itself among the oldest anglophone churches in West Quebec.

Church History
St. Stephen's was first built as a wooden church by the English and Scottish settlers of Buckingham, Quebec in 1852. Under the direction of the Anglican Diocese of Montreal, Anglican missionaries began organizing a congregation in the rural logging settlement in the early 1840s. With the impending construction of the first church in the region sponsored by The Church of England, the area welcomed its first full-time Anglican priest, Rev. Richard L. Stevenson, in 1850. With the support of a growing anglophone population, a larger stone church was erected in 1899 to replace the wooden building built by the early settlers. This second church continues to be used for worship and community events to this day.

The Diocese of Montreal formally transferred the Parish of Buckingham, comprising St. Stephen's and St. Thomas Anglican Church, Silver Creek, Quebec, to the Anglican Diocese of Ottawa in the mid-twentieth century.

Church Today
The church is designated as a chapel of ease connected to the Parish of Chelsea-Lascelles-Wakefield. Services are scheduled seasonally, and are led by either an ordained Anglican priest or a licensed lay reader. The church is also available by request for weddings, funerals, baptisms, confirmations and other such occasions. The church's Toope Memorial Hall, built in the 1960s with the support of the Erco Chemical Company and dedicated to the memory of The Rev. Frank Toope and his wife Jocelyn, is a popular community centre that is often rented out to local residents and groups for large receptions and other activities.

The priest-in-charge of St. Stephen's is the Reverend Canon Kevin Flynn, who serves as Incumbent of the Parish of Chelsea-Lascelles-Wakefield in the Gatineau Hills.

St. John's Chapel
In 2013, under the leadership of churchwardens John Carson and Barbara Elliott—and following a donation of sanctuary furnishings from the former St. John's Quyon—the parishioners of St. Stephen's transformed their former Sunday School room into a beautifully appointed winter chapel. Named in honour of the Quyon congregation, "St. John's Chapel" was officially opened by the Archdeacon of Clarendon, the Venerable Sally Gadd, on November 24, 2013, and blessed by the Rt. Rev. Dr. John H. Chapman, Bishop of Ottawa, on May 8, 2016.

Camp ARK &  Ecumenical Youth Activities
St. Stephen's first sponsored an ecumenical Daily Vacation Bible School called "Camp ARK: Acts of Random Kindness," for children ages 5 to 13 from August 9 to 12 2010 at St. Stephen's Church Hall, Buckingham. The camp, which was a great success, also received financial support from St. Stephen's and St. John's Glen Almond. In total, fourteen children attended the first camp. The second edition of Camp ARK was held from August 8 to 11 2011; forty-five children attended the second edition of the program. Camp ARK 2012 was held from August 13 to 16 2012 at St. Andrew's United Church and included 51 students. In 2013 Camp ARK returned to St. Stephen's and hosted a record seventy-one students between August 12 and 15. Following a one-year hiatus, Camp Ark returned in 2015 and hosted a further fifty campers.

Building on the camp's numerous years of success, three of Buckingham's English speaking Christian communities (Our Lady of Victory Roman Catholic, St. Andrew's United and the Anglican Parish of Eastern Outaouais) now offer a joint youth group on the first Friday of every month, "The Friday Night Faith Buddies," and an ecumenical Sunday School on the first Sunday of every month. Parents desiring information should contact the St. Stephen's churchwardens or visit the parish's Facebook page.

Christmas Bazaar
In the late fall the congregation hosts a popular Christmas bazaar in partnership with St. John's Anglican Church Glen Almond.

Cemetery Memorial Service
St. Stephen's annual Cemetery Memorial service is typically held on the fourth Sunday in September at 2pm. Visitors are encouraged to confirm event scheduling with the chapel steward.

Photo gallery

See also
 Anglican Diocese of Ottawa
 St. Thomas Anglican Church, Silver Creek, Quebec
 Anglican Church of Canada
 Anglican Communion

References

External links
 St. Stephen's Buckingham Facebook Page
 Diocese of Ottawa website

Churches completed in 1852
19th-century Anglican church buildings in Canada
Anglican church buildings in Quebec
Buildings and structures in Gatineau
1845 establishments in Canada